Ready Five, also referred to as Alert Five in the film Top Gun, is a condition of high alert for aircraft crews on the flight deck of an aircraft carrier, in which they are ready to launch within five minutes.  Fighter aircraft are placed on the steam catapult complete with flight crew, armament, and fuel, ready to defend the carrier battle group from any unforeseen threat.

Flight crews sometimes dread being assigned Ready Five, as they can be ordered to remain there for hours on end, in addition to the high probability of being sent into combat on short notice.

Naval aviation